Cerconota seducta is a moth in the family Depressariidae. It was described by Edward Meyrick in 1918. It is found in French Guiana.

The wingspan is about 17 mm. The forewings are fuscous-whitish or whitish-fuscous, somewhat sprinkled fuscous irregularly. There are three cloudy fuscous transverse lines, somewhat thickened on the costa, obscurely white-edged anteriorly, the first at one-third, straight, almost direct, the second from the middle of the costa, straight, rather oblique, the second discal stigma forming a small darker mark on it, the third from three-fourths of the costa, indented beneath the costa, then curved to the dorsum before the tornus. A marginal series of blackish dots is found around the apical part of the costa and termen, surrounded with white suffusion. The hindwings are light grey.

References

Moths described in 1918
Cerconota
Taxa named by Edward Meyrick